= Alexander Fekete =

American physician (1827–1911)

- Born: December 2, 1827
- Died: March 1911 (aged 83–84); East St. Louis, Illinois, U.S.
- Military career
- Units: 5th Missouri Regiment; 13th Chivalry Regiment of Missouri
- Conflicts: Hungarian Revolution of 1848; American Civil War

Alexander Fekete (December 2, 1827 — March 1911) was a Hungarian and American soldier and physician.

== Biography ==
He was born in né Sándor Fekete, Hungary on December 2, 1827.

During the Hungarian Revolution of 1848, he fought as a soldier under the flags of Lajos Kossuth. He was imprisoned in the Austrian Empire. He escaped to the Ottoman Empire. He moved to the United States in 1852, where he settled in East St. Louis. He learned medicine here, where later practiced as well. When American Civil War broke out, he entered to the 5th Missouri Regiment where he became major. He was a doctor at the 13th Chivalry Regiment of Missouri.

After the end of Civil War, he returned to East St. Louis, where he became major of the town and later he was appointed as a postmaster. He died there at the beginning of March, 1911.

== Sources ==
- Magyarok Amerikában : az amerikai magyarság története : 1583–1926. 1. köt. / Kende Géza. – 1927. 375 p. Fekete Sándor see 365. p.
